Sowter is a surname. Notable people with the surname include:

Francis Sowter (died 1928), British Archdeacon
Nathan Sowter (born 1992), Australian-born English cricketer
Unwin Sowter (1839–1910), English cricketer

See also
Powter
Souter